Middle Franconia is one of the three administrative regions of Franconia in Bavaria, Germany. It is located in the west of Bavaria and borders the state of Baden-Württemberg. The administrative seat is Ansbach; however, the most populous city is Nuremberg.

Subdivisions
The region is divided into seven districts ('Landkreise') and five independent cities ('Kreisfreie Städte'). The lowest level is divided into 210 municipalities (including five cities).

Independent cities
 Ansbach
 Erlangen
 Fürth
 Nuremberg
 Schwabach

Districts
 Ansbach
 Erlangen-Höchstadt
 Fürth
 Neustadt (Aisch)-Bad Windsheim
 Nürnberger Land
 Roth
 Weißenburg-Gunzenhausen

History

After the founding of the Kingdom of Bavaria the state was totally reorganised and, in 1808, divided into 15 administrative government regions (German: Regierungsbezirke (singular Regierungsbezirk)), in Bavaria called Kreise (singular: Kreis). They were created in the fashion of the French departements, quite even in size and population, and named after their main rivers.

In the following years, due to territorial changes (e. g. loss of Tyrol, addition of the Palatinate), the number of Kreise was reduced to 8. One of these was the Rezatkreis (Rezat District). In 1837 king Ludwig I of Bavaria renamed the Kreise after historical territorial names and tribes of the area. This also involved some border changes or territorial swaps. Thus the district name of Rezatkreis changed to Middle Franconia.

Main sights
Next to the major city Nuremberg, the capital Ansbach and the former residence city Erlangen, the towns of the Romantic Road Rothenburg ob der Tauber and Dinkelsbühl belong to the major tourist attractions. The Lichtenau Fortress, Rothenberg Fortress, Hohenstein and Cadolzburg belong to the most important castles of  Middle Franconia. The Franconian Jura and the northern valley of the River Altmühl are among the scenic attractions.

Coat of arms

Population

Economy 
The Gross domestic product (GDP) of the region was 78.6 billion € in 2018, accounting for 2.4% of German economic output. GDP per capita adjusted for purchasing power was 40,900 € or 136% of the EU27 average in the same year. The GDP per employee was 105% of the EU average.

See also

 Upper Franconia (Oberfranken)
 Lower Franconia (Unterfranken)

References

External links
(Middle Franconia State Government; Regierung von Mittelfranken 
Bezirk Mittelfranken 

 
NUTS 2 statistical regions of the European Union
Wine regions of Germany
Government regions of Germany